Husām ad-Dīn Mānikpūrī was a 15th-century Islamic scholar of North India. He belonged to the Chishti order, following his teacher Nur Qutb Alam of Bengal.

Life
Manikpuri was a descendant of Mir Syed Shahabuddin of the Gardēzī Sadaat family, who had settled in Manikpur during the reign of Iltutmish (r. 1211–1236).

He travelled to the Bengal Sultanate, where he studied under Nur Qutb Alam of Hazrat Pandua. Following his studies, he fasted for seven years.

Death
There is a debate on the date of his death. According to Ghulam Sarwar Lahori, he died on in 882 AH (1477-1478 CE). On the other hand, Hasan Askari asserts that Manikpuri died on 15 Ramadan 853 AH (9 November 1449 CE). Presently, his followers commemorate his annual urs (death anniversary) on 11 March. He is buried in Garhi Manikpur, Pratapgarh, Uttar Pradesh.

Writings
Anīs al-ʿĀshiqīn
Rafīq al-ʿĀrifīn, compiled by his disciple Farid bin Salar
Khulastul Awraad 
Risal e Mahvia
Maktoobat-e-Mānikpūr

References

Further reading
Bahre Zakkhar
Lataife-Ashrafi (Discourses of Ashraf Jahangir Semnani) Compiled by Nizam Yemeni,  Edited and annotated by Syed Waheed Ashraf, published in 2010
Mir'at-ul-Israr by Syed Abdur Rahman Chisti

15th-century Indian people
Indian Sufis
People from Pratapgarh district, Uttar Pradesh
Gardēzī Sadaat
Hanafis